Jonathan Kiril Thomas Menkos Zeissig (born 29 June 1975) is a Guatemalan economist, politician, writer, academic and analyst. He has been president of the Central American Institute of Fiscal Studies (ICEFI) since September 2012.

On March 5, 2019, the Board of Directors of the Central American Institute of Fiscal Studies announced that Menkos requested a license to be absent from his duties as President of the Central American Institute of Fiscal Studies from March 1 to August 15, 2019. Hours later, the political party Movimiento Semilla announced that Menkos had been elected as its Vice Presidential candidate and running partner of ex-attorney general Thelma Aldana.

References

 

1975 births
Living people
People from Guatemala City
Guatemalan journalists
Male journalists
Guatemalan writers
Guatemalan academics
Guatemalan politicians
Universidad de San Carlos de Guatemala alumni